Rose of My Heart is the sixth studio album by American singer Nicolette Larson. It was produced by Emory Gordy Jr. and Tony Brown, and released by MCA Records in 1986.

Background
Rose of My Heart was Larson's second and final country album for MCA. It peaked at No. 40 on the Billboard Top Country Albums and remained on the chart for sixteen weeks. Three singles were released from the album. "Let Me Be the First" was released in February 1986 and reached No. 63 on Billboard's Hot Country Songs. "That's How You Know When Love's Right", a duet with Steve Wariner, was released in May and reached No. 9. It proved to be Larson's most successful entry on the Country Songs chart. In September, the final single, "That's More About Love (Than I Wanted to Know)", was released and reached No. 49.

In 2012, Raven Records gave the album its first CD release, as a double-album set with Larson's 1985 album ...Say When.

Critical reception

Upon release, Billboard felt the album had a "few strays [to] keep this from being a total country album, but the songs that are country are wonderfully so". They felt some of the songs saw Larson "archive the musical purity and dramatic intensity of Emmylou Harris or Linda Ronstadt at their best". Cash Box considered the album to be "filled with strong material". They wrote: "Larson's voice suits the selections well and she does a fine job delivering."

In a retrospective review, Stephen Thomas Erlewine of AllMusic commented: "Larson's heart still seems to lie in California but that pull between mellow vibes and precision-tuned Nashville turns Rose of My Heart into a winning little record."

Track listing

Chart performance

Personnel
 Nicolette Larson - lead vocals (all tracks), backing vocals (track 3, 5, 7)
 Richard Bennett - acoustic guitar (tracks 1-4, 6-10), electric guitar (track 7), soloist (track 7)
 Larry Byrom - electric guitar (tracks 1-2, 4, 6, 9), acoustic guitar (tracks 3, 7-8, 10)
 Reggie Young - electric guitar (all tracks)
 David Hungate - bass (all tracks)
 Eddie Bayers - drums (all tracks)
 Harry Stinson - backing vocals (tracks 1, 4, 6-9)
 Mac McAnally - backing vocals (tracks 1, 4, 8)
 Steve Wariner - lead vocals (track 2)
 Emory Gordy Jr. - Synclavier strings (track 2)
 Sonny Garrish - steel guitar (tracks 2, 4, 10)
 Mat Morse, Hollis Halford - Synclavier programming (tracks 2, 6)
 Dave Loggins - lead vocals (track 3)
 John Jarvis - DX-7 synthesizer (tracks 3, 6-8, 10), piano (track 4)
 Farrell Morris - percussion (tracks 3, 5-6)
 Vicki Hampton, Yvonne Hodges - backing vocals (tracks 3, 5)
 Troy Seals - bass vocals (track 5)
 Joy Jackson - backing vocals (track 5)
 Paul Davis - Synclavier (track 6)
 Deborah Allen, Rafe Van Hoy - backing vocals (track 6)
 Glen Duncan - fiddle (tracks 7-8)
 Russ Pahl - steel guitar (tracks 8-9)
 Linda Ronstadt - harmony vocals (track 10)

Production
 Emory Gordy Jr., Tony Brown - producers
 Keith Odle, Mark J. Coddington, Russ Martin - second engineers
 Steve Tillisch - recording
 Glenn Meadows - mastering

Other
 Bill Barnes, Matt Barnes - design
 Simon Levy - art direction
 Barnes & Company - graphics
 Deb Mahalanobis - lettering
 Peter Nash - photography

References

1986 albums
Nicolette Larson albums
MCA Records albums
Albums produced by Emory Gordy Jr.
Albums produced by Tony Brown (record producer)